John Michael Parker (born 2 May 1938) is a British former Olympic hurdler.

Athletics career
Parker represented his country at the 1964 and 1968 Summer Olympics.

Parker represented England and won a silver medal in the 120 yards hurdles, at the 1966 British Empire and Commonwealth Games in Kingston, Jamaica.

References 

1938 births
Living people
British male hurdlers
Olympic athletes of Great Britain
Athletes (track and field) at the 1964 Summer Olympics
Athletes (track and field) at the 1968 Summer Olympics
Athletes (track and field) at the 1966 British Empire and Commonwealth Games
Commonwealth Games medallists in athletics
Commonwealth Games silver medallists for England
Medallists at the 1966 British Empire and Commonwealth Games